Larry James Hale (October 9, 1941 – September 27, 2019) was a Canadian professional ice hockey defenceman who played four seasons in the National Hockey League (NHL) with the Philadelphia Flyers and six seasons in the World Hockey Association (WHA) with the Houston Aeros. He retired to Penticton, British Columbia later in his life, and died there in 2019 at the age of 77.

References

External links
 

1941 births
2019 deaths
Canadian ice hockey defencemen
Edmonton Oil Kings (WCHL) players
Houston Aeros (WHA) players
Ice hockey people from British Columbia
Minneapolis Millers (IHL) players
People from Summerland, British Columbia
Philadelphia Flyers players
Quebec Aces (AHL) players
Richmond Robins players
Seattle Totems (WHL) players